The 2019–2020 MPBL season, known as the MPBL Lakan Season or the Chooks-to-Go MPBL Lakan Season for sponsorship reasons, was the third season of the Maharlika Pilipinas Basketball League. It began June 12, 2019 and ended on March 21, 2021, nearly two years later due to the COVID-19 pandemic in the Philippines causing a one-year long suspension that lasted from March 11, 2020 to March 10, 2021. The season resumed on March 11, 2021 with a bubble in Subic, Zambales.

This season featured 31 teams, an increase from last season's 26 and is currently the most teams in a single season in league history.

The San Juan Knights entered the season as defending champions, defeating the Davao Occidental Tigers, three games to two, in the 2019 MPBL Finals. The two teams would meet again in the 2021 MPBL Finals, where Davao Occidental would get their revenge, beating San Juan, three games to one.

Format 
The format for this season was:

 All 31 teams are divided into two divisions: the Northern and Southern Divisions, which consist of 16 and 15 teams, respectively.
 Like previous seasons, teams will play in a single round-robin format during the regular season, with each team playing 30 games, playing each team once. Games are played in a team's homecourt, but not all games feature the home team, technically making them neutral site games.
 At the end of the regular season, all teams are ranked by their win-loss records. The top eight teams in each division advance to the playoffs.
 The first three rounds of the playoffs will be a best-of-three series, while the MPBL Finals will be a best-of-five series.
 Unlike most sports, homecourt advantage in the playoffs works differently in the MPBL:
 In the First Round, the first- and second-seeded teams host all game 1s in its own division, while the third- and fourth-seeded teams host all game 2s in its own division. Any game 3s will be hosted by the first- or second-seeded teams.
 In the Semifinals, the highest-seeded team hosts all game 1s in its own division, while the second highest-seeded team hosts all game 2s in its own division. Any game 3s will be hosted by the highest-seeded team that hasn't advanced yet.
 In the Divisional Finals and National Finals, a traditional homecourt advantage system is used. A 1-1-1 format is used for the Divisional Finals, while a 2-2-1 format is used for the National Finals.
 The winning team from each playoff series advances to the next round until one team from each division remains, where the champion is decided in the MPBL Finals.

Transactions

Coaching changes

Team changes

Participation changes 
The Mandaluyong El Tigre would depart from the league, marking the first time a team didn't return to complete in the league.

Meanwhile, six new teams made their first league appearances. These include the Bacolod Master Sardines, Bicol Volcanoes, Iloilo United Royals, Mindoro Tamaraws, Nueva Ecija MiGuard, and Soccsksargen Marlins.

This increases the number of participating teams up to 31, currently the most for a single season in league history.

Team realignment 
Also for the first time, there was a realignment within the divisions. The Marikina Shoemasters, Parañaque Patriots, and Rizal Golden Coolers all moved to the Northern Division.

Name changes
 The Zamboanga Family's Brand Sardines Valientes was relaunched as Zamboanga Family's Brand Sardines before the start of the season.
 The Cebu City Sharks changed their team name to Cebu Sharks before the start of the season, then later as Cebu Casino Ethyl Alcohol in October 2019
 The Imus Bandera changed their team name to Imus Khaleb Shawarma before the start of the season, then later as Imus Bandera-Luxxe Slim in December 2019
 The Laguna Heroes changed their team name to Biñan City Krah Heroes before the start of the season, then later as Biñan City Luxxe White in November 2019
 The Navotas Clutch changed their team name to Navotas Uni-Pak Sardines in June 2019
 The Valenzuela Classic changed their team name to Valenzuela SPVTOP Marketplace in June 2019, then later as Val City-Carga Backload Solution in November 2019
 The Nueva Ecija MiGuard changed their team name to Nueva Ecija ForestLake in August 2019, then later as Nueva Ecija Rice Vanguards in October 2019
 The Bataan Risers changed their team name to 1Bataan Risers-Camaya Coast in November 2019
 The Soccsksargen Marlins-Armor On changed their team name to Sarangani Marlins in November 2019

Opening ceremony
The opening ceremony took place on June 12, 2019 at the SM Mall of Asia Arena in Pasay, coinciding with Philippine Independence Day.

The muses for the participating teams are as follows:

Regular season

Northern Division

Southern Division

Results

Not all games are in home–away format. Each team plays every team once. Number of asterisks after each score denotes number of overtimes played.

Playoffs 

Teams in bold advanced to the next round. The numbers to the left of each team indicate the team's seeding in its division, and the numbers to the right indicate the number of games the team won in that round. Teams with home court advantage, the higher seeded team, are shown in italics.

Northern Division
The Makati Super Crunch were unable to host games at the Makati Coliseum; so for the instances that they were to host a game, their opponents hosted, instead.

First round
In the first round, the teams were grouped into two groups. The No. 1 and the No. 4 teams hosted alternately, while the No. 2 and No. 3 teams did the same, with the top two seeds hosting game 3 if they are still in contention.

|}

Division Semifinals 
The top two remaining seeds hosted alternately, with the top remaining seeded team hosting game 3 if they are still in contention.

|}

Division Finals 
The remaining teams would've hosted alternately. However, due to the COVID-19 pandemic, game 2 was played behind closed doors. Competition was then suspended for a year, until the league were cleared by the Inter-Agency Task Force for the Management of Emerging Infectious Diseases to host a bubble in Subic, Zambales, where all remaining games were played.

|}

Southern Division
The Davao Occidental Tigers were unable to host a game in Davao Occidental due to lack of facilities; all of the games they would have hosted have been held in the Metro Davao area.

First round
In the first round, the teams were grouped into two groups. The No. 1 and the No. 4 teams hosted alternately, while the No. 2 and No. 3 teams did the same, with the top two seeds hosting game 3 if they are still in contention.

|}

Division Semifinals 
The top two remaining seeds hosted alternately, with the top remaining seeded team hosting game 3 if they are still in contention.

|}

Division Finals 
The remaining teams would've hosted alternately. However, due to the COVID-19 pandemic, the game 2, which was supposed to be hosted by the lower-seeded team, was played behind closed doors. Competition was then suspended for a year, until the league were cleared by the Inter-Agency Task Force for the Management of Emerging Infectious Diseases to host a bubble in Subic, Zambales, where all remaining games will be played.

The Basilan Steel defaulted Game 3 after multiple positive COVID-19 tests inside the bubble.

|}

MPBL Finals 

All games will be held in the Subic Gym Gymnasium in Subic, Zambales inside a bubble.

|}

Awards 
The individual league awards was given during the Game 4 of the 2021 MPBL Lakan Cup National Finals at the Subic Bay Gymnasium in Subic.

Statistics

MPBL All Star Game
 On February 13, 2020, the league held its second MPBL All-Star Game at the Mall of Asia Arena where the Southern All-Stars prevailed over the Northern All-Stars for the second time 126–122. Jeff Viernes of the Batangas City Athletics was named as his second MPBL All-Star Game MVP.

Game

 MPBL All-star MVP: Jeff Viernes 
 Slam Dunk Contest Champion: David Carlos 
 3-point Shootout Champion: Lester Alvarez

References 

 
MPBL season
2019–20 in Philippine basketball leagues